Kimberly: The People I Used to Know is the fourth studio album by American singer K. Michelle, released on December 8, 2017, through Atlantic Records. The album was preceded by the release of the singles "Birthday", "Either Way", "Make This Song Cry" and "Crazy Like You".

Kimberly: The People I Used to Know debuted on the US Billboard 200 at number fifty-six with 8,804 copies sold, becoming the lowest selling debuting album of Michelle's career so far and continuing a downward trend in her commercial success. Fans openly criticized Michelle's label for the lack of support with Kimberly: The People I Used to Know and Michelle later asked to be released from her contract with Atlantic Records (Warner Bros), as a result.

Background and release

On December 21, 2016, K. Michelle announced that her fourth album would be released in 2017 via Twitter with an acronym "TCE". During the final season of her reality show "K. Michelle: My Life, the singer revealed a song titled "Heaven", calling the song "one of my most personal records on my new album". On September 8, 2017, in an interview with Billboard, the album's title was revealed "Kimberly: The People I Used to Know". On October 13, 2017, the album cover, track list and release date was revealed.

Singles
"Birthday" was released as the album's lead single on September 8, 2017. "Either Way" featuring American singer Chris Brown was released as the album's second single on September 15, 2017. The song debuted at number 19 on the US Billboard R&B Digital Song Sales chart for the week beginning October 7, 2017. "Make This Song Cry" was released as the album's third single on October 6, 2017. "Crazy Like You" was released as the album's fourth single on August 12, 2018.

Critical response

On AllMusic, Andy Kellman gave the album four stars out of five, stating that "she has too much on her mind - and has such an imaginative and proficient way of getting it all out - to truly bail." Glenn Gamboa from Newsday wrote that "It’s a shoot-from-the-hip style given to hits and misses, but when K. Michelle connects, she hits hard."

Pitchforks Alfred Soto graded it 7 points out of 10, commenting that "KIMBERLY: The People I Used to Know may lack a thumper like "V.S.O.P." or a slow jam as urgent as "Drake Would Love Me," still her greatest performance, but it continues a remarkable four-album streak." Rachael Scarsbrook of Renowned for Sound gave the album 4 stars out of 5, wrote that "There is enough differentiation to maintain intrigue even if the album is some 20+ tracks long. K Michelle is never one to mince her words, and she’s certainly not going to be changing that any time soon.

Track listing

Notes
 signifies a vocal producer
 signifies a co-producer
 signifies an additional producer

Sample credits
 "Make This Song Cry" contains elements of "Song Cry", written by Shawn Carter, Douglas Gibbs, Randolph Johnson and Justin Smith.

Charts

Release history

References

2017 albums
Atlantic Records albums
K. Michelle albums